In information theory, the error exponent of a channel code or source code over the block length of the code is the rate at which the error probability decays exponentially with the block length of the code. Formally, it is defined as the limiting ratio of the negative logarithm of the error probability to the block length of the code for large block lengths. In this example,  approaches  for large . Many of the information-theoretic theorems are of asymptotic nature, for example, the channel coding theorem states that for any rate less than the channel capacity, the probability of the error of the channel code can be made to go to zero as the block length goes to infinity. In practical situations, there are limitations to the delay of the communication and the block length must be finite. Therefore, it is important to study how the probability of error drops as the block length go to infinity.

Error exponent in channel coding

For time-invariant DMC's 

The channel coding theorem states that for any ε > 0 and for any rate less than the channel capacity, there is an encoding and decoding scheme that can be used to ensure that the probability of block error is less than ε > 0 for sufficiently long message block X. Also, for any rate greater than the channel capacity, the probability of block error at the receiver goes to one as the block length goes to infinity.

Assuming a channel coding setup as follows: the channel can transmit any of  messages, by transmitting the corresponding codeword (which is of length n). Each component in the codebook is drawn i.i.d. according to some probability distribution with probability mass function Q. At the decoding end, maximum likelihood decoding is done.

Suppose the first message is selected, so codeword  is transmitted.

The function  has upper bound

for  Thus,

Since there are a total of M messages, and the entries in the codebook are i.i.d., the probability that  is confused with any other message is  times the above expression. Using the union bound, the probability of confusing  with any message is bounded by:

for any . Averaging over all combinations of :

Using the independence nature of the elements of the codeword, and the discrete memoryless nature of the channel:

Using the fact that each element of codeword is identically distributed and thus stationary:

Replacing M by 2nR and defining

probability of error becomes

Q and  should be chosen so that the bound is tighest. Thus, the error exponent can be defined as

Error exponent in source coding

For time invariant discrete memoryless sources 

Let  be the total number of possible messages. Next map each of the possible source output sequences to one of the messages randomly using a uniform distribution and independently from everything else. When a source is generated the corresponding message  is then transmitted to the destination. The message gets decoded to one of the possible source strings. In order to minimize the probability of error the decoder will decode to the source sequence  that maximizes , where  denotes the event that message  was transmitted. This rule is equivalent to finding the source sequence  among the set of source sequences that map to message  that maximizes . This reduction follows from the fact that the messages were assigned randomly and independently of everything else.

Thus, as an example of when an error occurs, supposed that the source sequence  was mapped to message  as was the source sequence . If  was generated at the source, but  then an error occurs.

Let  denote the event that the source sequence  was mapped to the same message as the source sequence  and that . Thus, letting  denote the event that the two source sequences  and  map to the same message, we have that

and using the fact that  and is independent of everything else have that

A simple upper bound for the term on the left can be established as

for some arbitrary real number  This upper bound can be verified by noting that  either equals  or  because the probabilities of a given input sequence are completely deterministic. Thus, if  then  so that the inequality holds in that case. The inequality holds in the other case as well because

for all possible source strings.

Where the inequalities follow from a variation on the Union Bound. Finally applying this upper bound to the summation for  have that:

Where the sum can now be taken over all  because that will only increase the bound. Ultimately yielding that

Now for simplicity let  so that  Substituting this new value of  into the above bound on the probability of error and using the fact that  is just a dummy variable in the sum gives the following as an upper bound on the probability of error:

Thus, simplifying the above equation yields

Letting  see that the error exponent for the source coding case is:

See also 

 Source coding
 Channel coding

References
R. Gallager, Information Theory and Reliable Communication, Wiley 1968

Information theory
Data compression